Corvette captain is a rank in many navies which theoretically corresponds to command of a corvette (small warship). The equivalent rank in the United Kingdom, Commonwealth, and United States is lieutenant commander.  The Royal Canadian Navy uses bilingual ranks, with capitaine de corvette being the French equivalent of lieutenant commander.

Notable users of the rank of corvette captain in Europe include the navies of France, Germany, Italy, Spain, and Croatia. Other users include many Latin American countries.

While the NATO rank code is OF-3, the official translation of the rank as per NATO STANAG 2116 varies between "commander junior grade" and "commander" (with the next senior rank being translated as "commander senior grade"). Some NATO members class their corvette captains as OF-4 when they are serving afloat.

Germany

Korvettenkapitän is an OF3 rank equivalent to the German Army and German Air Force rank of Major.

Gallery

See also
 Corvette lieutenant

References

Naval ranks